The Double Decker Taco was an offering of Taco Bell restaurants. It was a traditional crunchy taco with a tortilla secured to the outside with a layer of refried beans.

History
The Double Decker Taco was introduced as a limited-run promotional item in 1995, and was advertised in a series of commercials produced by Spike Lee featuring NBA basketball stars Shaquille O'Neal and Hakeem Olajuwon, before becoming a permanent menu item. The Double Decker Taco joined the regular menu items in June 2006. A cheesy version, which featured nacho cheese sauce in addition to the refried beans in between the tortilla and the taco shell, was briefly introduced in 2011.

On September 12, 2019, Taco Bell removed the Double Decker Taco from their menu.

References

Taco Bell
Taco